The Fulda-Werra Uplands are a major natural regional unit (no. 357) in the East Hesse Highlands (major unit group 35) in East and North Hesse and, with small elements in the southeast, in the German state of Thuringia. Most of the range lies right of the River Fulda and left of the Werra. The uplands extend from the Rhön mountains northwards, to the River Weser near Hann. Münden.

Other well known upland areas are the Kaufungen Forest in the extreme north, the Stölzinger Hills in the centre and the Seulingswald in the south.

Hills 
The hills of the Fulda-Werra Uplands include the following – sorted by height in metres (m) above Normalnull (NN):
 Hoher Meißner (753.6 m); Hoher Meißner in the Meißner region
 Hirschberg (643.4 m); Söhre
 Bilstein (641.2 m); Anterior Kaufungen Forest
 Eisberg (583.0 m); northern Stolzhausen Ridge in the Stölzinger Hills
 Haferberg (580.4 m); Hinterer Kaufungen Forest
 Himmelsberg (563.7 m); Günsterode Heights in the Melsungen Upland 
 Alheimer (548.7 m); southern Stolzhausen Ridge in the Stölzinger Hills
 Dammskopf (520.9 m); Rotenburg-Ludwigseck Forest in the Neuenstein-Ludwigseck Ridge (near Schloss Ludwigseck by Atzelstein)
 Bielstein (527.8 m); Söhre
 Katzenstirn (500.7 m); southern Vockerode Upland in the Stölzinger Hills
 Toter Mann (480.3 m); Seulingswald
 Eichelsberg (480.1 m); Eichelsberg in the Neuenstein-Ludwigseck Ridge
 Herzberg (478.2 m); Richelsdorf Hills (Solztrottenwald)
 Kessel (368.1 m); Melgershausen Heights in the Neuenstein-Ludwigseck Ridge

Rivers 
The most important tributaries of the Fulda and Werra in the upland region named after them are (in upstream order, i.e. from north to south, rivers outside the boundary in brackets, lengths also in brackets):

References

General sources 
 BfN landscape fact files:
 Fulda-Werra Uplands (except the Kaufungen Forest, Meißner region and Bebra-Melsungen Fulda valley)
 Meißner region
 Kaufungen Forest (except the Söhre)
 Bebra-Melsunger Fulda valley

External links 
  of the Fulda-Werra Uplands with the natural region boundaries, all important hills and river systems / placemarks (Google Earth required)

! Fulda-Werra Uplands
East Hesse
North Hesse